Bedside Dentist, was a 1971 Danish erotic comedy film and part of the Bedside-films series, directed by John Hilbard from a screenplay by John Hilbard and Finn Henriksen, and produced by Finn Henriksen. The film highlighted, in parody, two versions of Danish masculinity. The film was released in the UK as Danish Dentist on the Job.

Plot 
A rich woman (Annie Birgit Garde) wants to endow her nephew (Ole Søltoft), who is a dental student, with a large fortune and her company. As she wants to make sure that he is a "real man" who is into "into beer, pussy and horn music", before passing the estate on to him and she hires a prostitute. Rumors spread about her nephews wealth, and women show interest.

Cast 
 Ole Søltoft as dental student Thomas
 Birte Tove as Nina
 Annie Birgit Garde as aunt Benedikte Swane-Hansen
 Carl Ottosen as professor Andreas Henningsen
 Soren Stromberg as Michael

References

External links 
 

Danish sex comedy films
1971 films